Santa Maria della Pietà is a Baroque-style, Roman Catholic church in Prato, region of Tuscany, Italy.

History and Description

The church was built between 1617-1620 to house a venerated 14th century icon of the Madonna and Child previously held in a tabernacle in the neighborhood (borgo) of Pesce. The church was designed by Gherardo Mechini who erected a typical Tuscan order portico. The interior has a delineated architecture recalling Brunelleschi churches. In 1699, the land adjacent was granted to the Discalced Carmelite nuns (Teresians), who built a convent. In 1786, the convent was suppressed, and the church became the Priory of Santa Caterina de’Ricci, but the Carmelites returned in 1792, and stayed until 1818, when they were moved to the Monastery of San Francesco. The Monastery was given to Gaetano Magnolfi to establish an orphanage and school. The former convent and orphanage is now a nursing home and cultural center.

The main altar was designed by mechini, but completed in polychrome marble by Giovanni Battista Cennini and Pier Maria Ciottoli. The main altar houses a 17th-century fresco of figures interacting with the framed 13th-century icon of the Madonna (1638), painted by Mario Balassi. This recalls the miraculous event in 1616 during which the Madonna from icon was observed to cry, are attributed to Giovanni Bonsi. Other paintings in the church include works by Matteo Bertini, Domenico Salvi, and Domenico Pedrini; and a St Theresa receives the Scapular from the Virgin by Alessandro Gherardini. In the piazza in front of the church is the ‘’Monument to Gaetano Magnolfi’’, patron of the former orphanage and school once located in the buildings annexed to the church.

Gallery

References

Roman Catholic churches completed in 1620
17th-century Roman Catholic church buildings in Italy
Roman Catholic churches in Prato
1620 establishments in Italy